James Murray Pakenham Pipon KBE CMG MVO (25 October 1882 – 14 January 1971) was a Royal Navy officer who served in World War I and, after being recalled to active duty in 1940, World War II.

Early life
He was the eldest son of Capt. John Pakenham Pipon of the Royal Navy.

Career
After World War I, he served as naval attaché in Paris, France, chief of staff to the Commander-in-Chief, Plymouth and commanded the battleship  in 1930–1932. His last appointment before retiring in 1936 was as Rear-Admiral-in-Command and Admiral-superintendent, HM Dockyard, Gibraltar.

The post of Senior British Naval Officer, Suez Canal Area was established on 14 December 1939, Vice Admiral James M. Pipon taking command on 7 January 1940. Pipon was shore based, at Ismailia in Egypt. He reported directly to the Commander-in-Chief Mediterranean Fleet. In the Navy List for December 1940 Pipon is shown as borne on the books of Stag, 'additional, for various services.'

Personal life
On 29 December 1921, Pipon was married to Hon. Bertha Louise Victoria Lopes (1895–1971), second daughter of Henry Lopes, 1st Baron Roborough and Lady Alberta Louisa Florence Edgcumbe (second daughter of William Edgcumbe, 4th Earl of Mount Edgcumbe and Lady Katherine Elizabeth Hamilton, the fourth daughter of James Hamilton, 1st Duke of Abercorn). Together, they were the parents of:

 Penelope Elizaneth Pipon, who married Colin Baker, of The Glebe House in Peter Tavy, Tavistock, Devon.

Pipon died on 14 January 1971.

References

Bibliography
 

1882 births
1971 deaths
Royal Navy admirals of World War II
Royal Navy officers of World War I
Royal Navy officers of World War II